Alexander Seaton or Seton (before 1626 – after 1649) was a Scottish soldier in Danish service during the Thirty Years' War. He briefly served as a governor in the Battle of Stralsund and as an admiral in the Torstenson War.

Biography

Neither the place nor the date of Alexander Seaton's birth are recorded. Though his parents remain unknown, it has been proposed that either Alexander Seton of Lathrisk or George Seton of Cariston be his father.

Alexander Seaton entered the service of Christian IV of Denmark, and advanced to the rank of a captain of infantry on 8 April 1626. Upon request by the Danish king, the Scottish Privy Council allowed Seaton to levy 500 Scottish soldiers on 30 June.

On 28 February 1627, he advanced to the rank of a lieutenant colonel. In September, he was wounded in battle near Oldenburg, while securing Bernhard of Saxe-Weimar's rear against Johann Tserclaes, Count of Tilly's forces during the Battle of Heiligenhafen.

He moved his company to Stralsund where they joined other Scots of Donald Mackay's regiment during the Battle of Stralsund (1628), where he served as lieutenant colonel. He succeeded the Danish-German mercenary Heinrich Holk as Stralsund's governor. During the time he was in command, the town withstood the siege of Albrecht von Wallenstein's imperial army. He was succeeded as the governor in July by Alexander Leslie, a Scot in Swedish service who arrived with a contingent of Scots, Swedes and Germans. Wallenstein lifted the siege on 4 August, forced to accept his first check in the Thirty Years' War.

Seaton did not stay with his regiment when it entered Swedish service, and instead joined the Norwegian infantry as a captain in 1628 - having left Mackay's troops as a lieutenant colonel. For the next 17 years, no records of Seaton's life are known.

By 1645, he had advanced to the rank of a colonel in the Norwegian army and navy again. In 1645, Seaton took over eight ships of the Danish navy to fight Sweden as an admiral - the last appointment of a British in Christian IV's service. With these ships, he took part in the "Norwegian response" by attacking Gothenburg (Göteborg) from the sea. Seaton's assault took place in August, just before the Treaty of Brömsebro ended the Danish-Swedish war in favour of Sweden on 13/23 August 1645.

The last record of Seaton is of 19 April 1649, when he was a colonel in the Norwegian army. Date and place of Seaton's death are unknown, marriages are not recorded.

See also
 Thirty Years' War
 Battle of Stralsund (1628)
 Alexander Leslie, 1st Earl of Leven
 Torstenson War
 Scotland and the Thirty Years' War

Notes

Sources

References

Bibliography

 
 
 
 
 
 
 

Steve Murdoch and Alexia Grosjean, Alexander Leslie and the Scottish Generals of the Thirty Years' War, 1618-1648 (London, 2014)

Scottish people of the Thirty Years' War
Scottish soldiers
Year of birth unknown
Year of death unknown
Scottish admirals
17th-century Scottish people
Place of birth unknown